Events from the year 1713 in Canada.

Incumbents
French Monarch: Louis XIV
British and Irish Monarch: Anne

Governors
Governor General of New France: Philippe de Rigaud Vaudreuil
Colonial Governor of Louisiana: Jean-Baptiste Le Moyne de Bienville then Antoine de la Mothe Cadillac
Governor of Nova Scotia: Francis Nicholson
Governor of Plaisance: Philippe Pastour de Costebelle

Events
 The Treaty of Utrecht. The French cede Newfoundland and the Hudson Bay region. They retain Cape Breton Island and Île Saint-Jean (Prince Edward Island).
 Treaty of Utrecht cedes French Acadia, Newfoundland, Hudson Bay and the "country of the Iroquois" to England.
 The Treaty of Utrecht ends Queen Anne's War, confirming British possession of Hudson Bay, Newfoundland and Acadia (except Île-Royale Cape Breton Island). France starts building Fortress Louisbourg near the eastern tip of Île-Royale.

Births
 Jean Baptiste de La Vérendrye born September 3, the eldest son of Pierre Gaultier de Varennes, sieur de La Vérendrye (died 1736).
 Michel Bénard, councillor of the conseil souverain.

Deaths
There were no relevant deaths during this year in Canada.

References

 
Canada
13